Early music festivals is a generic term for musical festivals focused on music before Beethoven, or including historically informed performance of later works. The increase in the number of music festivals specializing in early music is a reflection of the early music revival of the 1970s and 1980s. Many larger festivals such as that an Aix-en-Provence Festival also include early music sections, as do, inevitably, festivals of sacred music; such as the Festival de Música Sacra do Baixo Alentejo, in Portugal. Although most early music festivals are centered on commercial performance, many include also workshops. This articles includes an incomplete list of early music festivals, which may overlap with topics such as list of Bach festivals, list of maritime music festivals, list of opera festivals, and in some cases list of folk festivals.

List of festivals by country

Note this list includes festivals that are annual unless otherwise listed. Festivals which were notable, producing radio-broadcasts and recordings, but now defunct, are listed with an indent at the end of each country listing; for example Gottorfer Barockmusiktage, Germany.
Festival Opera Barocca

Australia
 Brisbane Baroque - previously Hobart Baroque, ran until 2016
MIFOH Melbourne International Festival of Organ and Harpsichord, founded by Sergio di Pieri in 1971 and run by an entirely voluntary group until the last concert in 2007. A further series of annual concerts running on the same framework (of concerts, visiting distinguished overseas musicians, and masterclasses) was operated by Professor John Griffiths from 2007-2010, a long time participant in MIFOH

Austria
 Resonanzen Konzerthaus, Vienna.
 Trigonale Festival der Alten Musik, Sankt Veit an der Glan, Carinthia. Sept.
 Internationale Barocktage, Stift Melk. May/June.
 Innsbrucker Festwochen der Alten Musik. July/August.
 Donaufestwochen im Strudengau. July/August

Bolivia
Festival de Chiquitos

Belgium
 Festival van Vlaanderen, section Musica Antiqua Bruges, July/August
 Laus Polyphoniae - Festival van Vlaanderen Antwerp August
 Festival van Vlaanderen, Gent. Sept/October.
 Festival de Musique Ancienne en Wallonie
 Baroque Music at Chateau of Chimay, Hainaut.
 Festival Les Nuits de Septembre - Festival de Wallonie, Liège

Brazil
 Festival de música colonial brasileira e música antiga. July.
Festival de Música Coral Renascentista Gil de Roca Sales.

Canada
 Montreal Baroque. June.
 Vancouver Early Music Festival. August.
 Pacific Baroque Festival, Victoria, B.C., February/March 
 Lameque International Baroque Music Festival, July

Croatia
 Rovigno Baroque Music Festival
 Varaždin Baroque Evenings (Varaždinske barokne večeri), Baroque Festival since 1971.
 Dubrovnik Summer Festival (Dubrovačke ljetne igre), since 1950.
 Korkyra Baroque Festival (Korčulanski barokni festival).
 Musical Evenings in St Donat (Glazbene večeri u sv. Donatu), since 1960.

Czech Republic
 Festival of early music at Český Krumlov
 Letní slavnosti staré hudby (Summer festivities of early music), Prague.
 Opera Barocca, Prague.
 Summer School of Early Music Prachatice

Denmark
 Copenhagen Renaissance Music Festival. October–November.

Finland
 BRQ Vantaa. August.
 Sastamala Gregoriana, Sastamala. July. Since 1995.

France
 Festival d'Ambronay, Ambronay. Since 1980.
 Festival de Beaune July.
 Festival de l'Abbaye Royale de Fontevraud, Fontevraud Abbey. Since 1975.
 Festival de Musique Ancienne de Saint Sevin, Saint Sevin. August.
 Musiques à la Chabotterie, Vendée. Since 1997.
 Marseille March.
 Nantes Spring. May/June
 Musique ancienne, Maguelone, Villeneuve-lès-Maguelone June.
 Haut-Jura June.
 Aix-en-Provence Festival July.
 Le Festival Renaissances, Bar-le-Duc. July.
 Musique ancienne de Callas, Callas, Var. July.
 Musique et Mémoire, Faucogney-et-la-Mer. July.
 Rencontres de Musique Médiévale du Thoronet. Le Thoronet Abbey
 Festival de musique de Conques. July–August.
 Festival Baroque de Tarentaise, Albertville. August.
 Le Festival International de Musique Ancienne de Simiane, Simiane-la-Rotonde. August.
 Festival de Sablé, Sablé-sur-Sarthe. August
 Academie Bach, Arques-la-Bataille. Aug.
 Festival de musique de La Chaise-Dieu, Auvergne. Aug-Sept.
Festival Les Riches Heures de La Réole. Septembre
 Festival baroque de Pontoise. Sept-Oct.
 Festival de Lanvellec. Oct.
 Marseille Autumn. October- December 
 Festival Paris Baroque, Paris. November-December 
 Saint-Michel en Thiérache, Saint-Michel, Aisne.
 Viola da gamba festival Asfeld.
 Orléans Bach Festival

Germany

 Bachwoche Ansbach, Ansbach summer.
 Arolser Barockfestspiele. Bad Arolsen. May.
 Bach-Biennale Weimar. Since 2008, biennial in July.
 Festival alter Musik Bernau, Berlin.
 Festival Güldener Herbst, Thuringia; in Weimar, Erfurt, Meiningen, Rudolstadt, Sondershausen, Eisenach, Kühndorf, Suhl and Molsdorf. October
 Händelfestspiele
Handel Festival, Halle (June)
Handel Festival, Göttingen (May)
Händel-Festspiele Karlsruhe (February)
 Magdeburger Telemann-Festtage, Magdeburg 
 Tage Alter Musik, Berlin Oct.
 Landshuter Hofmusiktage, Landshut
 Bachtage, Potsdam
 Bachfest Leipzig, Leipzig. June
 Montalbâne festival of Medieval music, Schloss Neuenburg, Freyburg. June. 
 Musica Viva, Osnabrück Land. Schloss Bad Iburg, Schloss Gesmold, Schloss Königsbrück, various churches and monasteries. September.
 Tage Mitteldeutscher Barockmusik.
 Tage Alter Musik Herne, Herne. November.
 , Regensburg, Whitsun
 Tage Alter Musik im Saarland (TAMiS), Saarbrücken, March/April 
 Sanssouci, Potsdam June
 Thüringer Bachwochen, Thuringia. March/April.
 Bayreuth Baroque Sept.
 Zeitfenster - Biennale Alter Musik, Berlin. Biannual in April.
 Internationales Heinrich-Schütz-Fest. Moves location, biannual.
 Gottorfer Barockmusiktage, ran from 2002-2006.

Ireland
 East Cork Early Music Festival
 Galway Early Music Festival
 Sligo Festival of Baroque Music

Israel
 Bach in Jerusalem Festival

Italy
 Grandezze & Meraviglie, Festival Musicale Estense, Modena. September/November Since 1998
Settimane barocche di Brescia, Brescia.
 Festival di Cremona Claudio Monteverdi, Cremona. May.
 FIMA - Festival di Musica Antica, Urbino. July. 
 FTMA - Festival Toscano di Musica Antica. Pisa.
 Festival Galuppi, Venice.
 Collegio Ghislieri di Pavia - Primavera Barocca. March–June. Since 2003.
 Musica Antica a Magnano, Magnano July/Sept.
 Mousiké - Festival di musica antica del Mediterraneo, Bari
 Musica Antica in Sicilia, Associazione Antonio il Verso, Palermo. December 
 Piccola Accademia di Montisi, Tuscany. Workshops for harpsichordists. July.
 Garda Trentino International Early Music Weeks, Riva del Garda.
Major festivals with some early music events:
 Stresa Festival. Stresa, Lake Maggiore. Some early music events.
 Ravenna Festival. Some early music events. June/July.
 Bolzano Festival. Some early music events.
 Alessandro Scarlatti Festival, Palermo, Sicily, ran 1999-2002

Hungary
 Early Music Festival at Palace of Arts (Budapest). Since 2015, first quarter of the year.
 Early Music Days at palace of Eszterhaza - Fertőd June/July, since 1984

Latvia
 Senās mūzikas festivāls, every July in the Rundāle Palace.
 Baroka mūzikas dienas Rēzeknē (Baroque Music Days Rezekne), every September 2005 – 2016 in Rezekne city, Latgale region and Riga.

Lithuania
 Banchetto Musicale early music festival, every September in Vilnius, since 1989

Malta
 Valletta International Baroque Festival

Netherlands
 Early Music Festival, Utrecht.
 Geelvinck Early Piano Festival, Amsterdam.

Norway
 Festival, Bergen.
 Festival, Larvik.
 St.Olav Festival, Trondheim.Ringve International Summer Course

Poland
 ANNUM festival Tarnowskie Góry, Chorzów
 Maj z Muzyką Dawną - May with Early Music, Wrocław
 Jarosław Early Music Festival, Jarosław
 Misteria Paschalia, Kraków. Easter
 Mikołaj Radomski (Early Music Festival), Radom
 International Festival Wratislavia Cantans, Wrocław
 Forum Musicum, Wrocław
 Early Music Academy, Wrocław

Portugal
Encontros de Música Antiga de Loulé - Francisco Rosado, EMAL-FR, every October since 1999, Loulé
West Coast Early Music Festival, Oeiras, Lisbon
SIMA - Série ibérica de Música Antiga, Castelo Branco
Festival Internacional de Música Barroca de Faro, FIMBF, Faro
Fora do Lugar - Early Music(s) International Festival, Idanha-a-Nova (UNESCO Creative City of Music)

Romania
 Bucharest Early Music Festival, Bucharest
 Miercurea Ciuc Early Music Festival, Miercurea Ciuc

Russia
 Sankt Petersburg International Early Music Festival, Saint Petersburg

Serbia
Belgrade Early Music Festival

Slovakia
 "Dni starej hudby" - Days of early music, Bratislava.

Slovenia
 Radovljica Early Music Festival, Radovljica, Velesovo and Ljubljana. August.
 Seviqc Brežice – Festival Brezice, Brežice.

Spain
 Festival Jordi Savall, Catalonia, since 2021.
 Festival de Música Antigua de Barcelona, Barcelona, since 1977.
 Festival de Música Antigua Iberoamericana "Domingo Marcos Durán". Cáceres.
 Festival de Música Antigua de Daroca, Zaragoza, since 1979. August.
 Festival de Música Antigua de Sevilla, Seville.
 Festival de Música Antigua, Gijón.
 Festival de Música Antigua de Úbeda y Baeza. Úbeda and Baeza since 1997.
 Festival Internacional de Música y Danza de Granada
 Música Antigua Aranjuez, Aranjuez.
 Musica Antigua Aracena, Aracena.
 Trobadories d'en Guillem de Bergueda, Berga, Berguedà. Named after Guilhem de Berguedan. ran 2006-2007
 Festival de Música Antigua de Sant Martí Vell, Gironès.
 Festival Internacional de Música Antigua de Xàtiva, Valencia

Sweden
 Drottningholm Palace Theatre August.
 Göteborg International Organ Academy. August.
 NoMeMus. Nordic festival for Medieval music. During Söderköpings Gästabud. August/September.
 Palladium Baroque. Malmö. Feb. 
 Stockholm Early Music Festival. The largest international event for historical music in the Nordic countries. First week in June since 2002.
 Söderköpings Gästabud. Medieval fayre in Söderköping. August/September.
 Trollhättans TIDIG MUSIK-dagar. Early music days in Trollhättan. May.

Switzerland
 Early Music Festival - La Folia. Rougemont. May/June.
 Festival Alte Musik Zürich. March.
 Nox Illuminata, Basel, cf. Schola Cantorum Basiliensis.
 Festival Bach de Lausanne. Oct/Nov.
 Festival Musikdorf Ernen. Ernen, Switzerland. July.
 Bachwochen Thun, Thun, August/September
 Cantar di Pietre. Lugano, Switzerland. October–November.

United Kingdom
 Birmingham Early Music Festival.
 Brighton Early Music Festival, Oct/Nov.
 English Bach Festival (ran from 1963 to 2009)
 Leicester Early Music Festival. June.
 Lufthansa Festival of Baroque Music, London. May.
 York Early Music Festival, July.
The London International Festival of Early Music. Three-day festival and instrument fair. November.
 London Handel Festival. Feb-April.
 Beverley and East Riding Early Music Festival, Yorkshire, May.
 Spitalfields Festival, London. June.
 Cotswold Early Music Festival, Cirencester. June.
 Edinburgh International Festival, some early music events. Aug/Sept.

United States
 American Bach Soloists Festival & Academy. San Francisco, California. Since 2010.
 Amherst Early Music Festival. New London, Connecticut.
Aston Magna Music Festival. Great Barrington, Massachusetts.
Baldwin Wallace Bach Festival
Carmel Bach Festival
English Bach Festival
 Bloomington Early Music Festival, Indiana
Berkeley Festival & Exhibition, presented by The San Francisco Early Music Society. Since 1990.
 Boston Early Music Festival.
Boulder Bach Festival. Boulder, Colorado
 Carmel Bach Festival, Carmel-by-the-Sea, California.
 Indianapolis Early Music Festival, Indiana. Since 1966.
 Houston Early Music Festival, Houston, Texas.
 Madison Early Music Festival, Madison, Wisconsin. Since 2000.
 New York Early Music Celebration, New York City. Since 2004.
 Piccolo Spoleto Festival Early Music Series, Charleston, South Carolina.
 Santa Cruz Baroque Festival, Santa Cruz, California.
 Texas Toot - The Texas Early Music Festival. Workshops.
 Twin Cities Early Music Festival and Baroque Instrumental Program. Minneapolis/St. Paul, Minnesota. Since 2014.
 Washington Early Music Festival], Washington, D.C.

See also

Historically informed performance
List of music festivals
List of Bach festivals
List of opera festivals
List of maritime music festivals
List of folk festivals
List of Celtic festivals 
:Category:Music festivals
Category:Early music festivals
Category:Choral festivals
Category:Classical music festivals
Category:Chamber music festivals
Category:Contemporary classical music festivals
Category:Opera festivals

References

External links

 
 
 
 

 
 Early